Kwon also written as Gwon is a Korean family name. Some sources list as many 56 clans, but most of them were merged with the Andong Gwon clan under the Sijeung-gong faction soon after the establishment of the Goryeo Kingdom.

Andong Gwon clan 
The founder of Andong Gwon clan, Gim Haeng (金幸), was originally a royalty of the Silla Gyeongju Gim clan. He participated in the Battle of Gochang and helped Taejo, who established the Kingdom of Goryeo in 918; the new king bestowed upon Gim Haeng a new surname: Gwon (權), as he could judge the situation correctly and achieve a purpose flexibly (能炳幾達權).

Yecheon Gwon clan 
One account has its original surname was Heun (昕). However, in 1197, the name Heun (昕) was chosen as the posthumous name for the Goryeo kingdom's King Myeongjong. To avoid the use of a king's posthumous name, the Heun (昕) family were directed to change their name to Gwon (權). The head of the Heun clan at this time became Gwon So, the founding ancestor of the Yecheon Gwon clan. Approximately two thirds of clan members live in the Gyeongsang provinces. All members of the Heun (昕) clan disappeared before the founding of Joseon.

Another account states that the Yecheon Heun (昕) clan's Jeoksin, Suchang, Seungdan, and Seungjo married into the Andong Gwon Clan and afterward their descendants took their mothers' surname Gwon (權). Yecheon Gwon clan called an Obongmun (五福門) in late Goryeo.

Notable people

Entertainers 
 BoA (born Kwon Boa, 1986), South Korean singer-songwriter, dancer, record producer and actress
 Kwon Eun-bi (born 1995), South Korean singer, former member of girl group Iz*One
 Kwon Eun-bin (born 2000), South Korean singer, member of girl group CLC
 Dean (South Korean singer) (born Kwon Hyuk, 1992), South Korean R&B singer, songwriter and producer
 Sol Bi (born Kwon Ji-an, 1984), South Korean actress and singer, former member of Typhoon
 Kwon Hwa-woon (born Kwon Shi-hyeon, 1989), South Korean actor and model
 Viini (born Kwon Hyun-bin, 1997), South Korean singer, rapper, actor and model, former member of boy group JBJ
 Loco (rapper) (born Kwon Hyuk-woo, 1989), South Korean rapper
 G-Dragon (born Kwon Ji-yong, 1988), South Korean musician, member of boy band Big Bang
 Hoshi (born Kwon Soon-Young, 1996), South Korean Singer, dancer, choreographer, member of boy band Seventeen
 Kwon Mina (born 1993), South Korean singer and actress, former member of AOA
 Sik-K (born Kwon Min-sik, 1994) South Korean rapper
 Kwon Nara (born 1991), South Korean singer, former member of girl group Hello Venus
 Kwon Ri-se (1991–2014), South Korean singer, member of girl group Ladies' Code
 Kwon Sang-woo (born 1976), South Korean actor
 Kwon So-hyun (born 1994), South Korean singer and dancer, former member of girl group 4Minute
 Kwon So-hyun (actress) (born 1987), South Korean actress
 Yul Kwon (born 1975), American reality television star, winner of Survivor: Cook Islands
 Kwon Yul (actor) (born Kwon Se-in, 1982), South Korean actor
 Kwon Yu-ri (born 1989), South Korean singer and actress, member of girl group Girls' Generation
 Edward Kwon (born Kwon Youngmin, 1971), South Korean chef

Others 
 Queen Hyeondeok (1418–1441), Joseon Dynasty consort
 Gwon Yul (1537–1599), Joseon Dynasty general
 Kwon Jeong-saeng (1937–2007), South Korean children's author
 Min Kwon (Korean name Kwon Min-kyung), American pianist
 Kwon Oh-hyun, South Korean businessman, CEO of Samsung
 Kwon Chang-hoon, South Korean football player
 Kwon Nam-joo, South Korean Overwatch player

See also 
 List of Korean family names
 Korean name
 List of people of Korean descent
 Kwon the Redeemer

References 

Korean-language surnames
North Gyeongsang Province
Andong
Yecheon County